Allan Leslie Cox (born October 4, 1927) is a Canadian former politician. He served in the Legislative Assembly of British Columbia from 1968 to 1969, as a Liberal member for the constituency of Oak Bay.

References

British Columbia Liberal Party MLAs
1927 births
Living people
Politicians from Victoria, British Columbia